In mathematics, nuclear operators between Banach spaces  are a linear operators between Banach spaces in infinite dimensions that share some of the properties of their counter-part in finite dimension. In Hilbert spaces such operators are usually called trace class operators and one can define such things as the trace. In Banach spaces this is no longer possible for general nuclear operators, it is however possible for -nuclear operator via the Grothendieck trace theorem.

The general definition for Banach spaces was given by Grothendieck. This article presents both cases but concentrates on the general case of nuclear operators on Banach spaces.

Nuclear operators on Hilbert spaces 

An operator  on a Hilbert space 

is compact if it can be written in the form

Here  is a set of real numbers, the set of singular values of the operator, obeying  if 

The bracket  is the scalar product on the Hilbert space; the sum on the right hand side must converge in norm.

An operator that is compact as defined above is said to be  or  if

Properties 

A nuclear operator on a Hilbert space has the important property that a trace operation may be defined.  Given an orthonormal basis  for the Hilbert space, the trace is defined as

Obviously, the sum converges absolutely, and it can be proven that the result is independent of the basis.

Nuclear operators on Banach spaces 

The definition of trace-class operator was extended to Banach spaces by Alexander Grothendieck in 1955.

There is a canonical evaluation map

An operator  is called  if it is in the image of this evaluation map.

-nuclear operators 

An operator

such that the operator may be written as

with the sum converging in the operator norm.

Operators that are nuclear of order 1 are called : these are the ones for which the series  is absolutely convergent. 
Nuclear operators of order 2 are called Hilbert–Schmidt operators.

Relation to trace-class operators 

With additional steps, a trace may be defined for such operators when

Properties 
The trace and determinant can no longer be defined in general in Banach spaces. However they can be defined for the so-called -nuclear operators via Grothendieck trace theorem.

Generalizations 

More generally, an operator from a locally convex topological vector space  to a Banach space  is called  if it satisfies the condition above with all  bounded by 1 on some fixed neighborhood of 0.

A monoidal category can be thought of as a category equipped with a suitable notion of a tensor product. 
An example of a monoidal category is the category of Banach spaces or alternatively the category of locally convex, complete, Hausdorff spaces; both equipped with the projective tensor product. 
A map  in a monoidal category is called  if it can be written as a composition

for an appropriate object  and maps  where  is the monoidal unit.

In the monoidal category of Banach spaces, equipped with the projective tensor product, a map is thick if and only if it is nuclear.

Examples 

Then the composition  is a nuclear operator.

See also

References 

 A. Grothendieck (1955), Produits tensoriels topologiques et espace nucléaires,Mem. Am. Math.Soc. 16. 
 A. Grothendieck (1956), La theorie de Fredholm, Bull. Soc. Math. France, 84:319–384. 
 A. Hinrichs and A. Pietsch (2010), p-nuclear operators in the sense of Grothendieck, Mathematische Nachrichen 283: 232–261. . 
 
 
 

Operator theory
Topological tensor products
Linear operators